Elemental Gearbolt, full title , is a light gun shooter for the Sony PlayStation. Developed by Alfa System, the game was published by Sony Computer Entertainment and released in Japan during holiday season of 1997. Working Designs licensed the game for the North American market and released it on June 30, 1998.

Elemental Gearbolt was critically well received due to its science fantasy setting, which is uncommon in light gun shooters, along with its incorporation of RPG elements, and particularly the artistry of its presentation. It features an orchestral soundtrack, and animated cutscenes directed by the anime director Rintaro.

Story
The events of the game are framed through Tagami, a mysterious figure who travels to the world in order to investigate what caused its destruction.

The world was home to two races, Audo and Sulunkan. The Sulunkan, descendants of a fallen magical empire, were oppressed by the Audo. There are resistance groups, but none strong enough to challenge the Audo ruling class. Nell and Seana, the Sugiku (half breed) daughters of a resistance leader, meet Bel Cain, the Sugiku son of the selfish King Jabugal. Nell and Bel Cain promise to meet again. Bel Cain breaks his amulet in two and gives Nell one half as a reminder.

Years later, Bel Cain becomes crown prince, full of ambition to end the bitter class struggle. Armed with advanced technology, he starts a campaign of conquest. Nell and Seana join the Sulunkan resistance, only to be killed. Their bodies are taken back to the capital city as trophies. One of Bel Cain's technologies, a Neural Network Computer, malfunctions and initiates a self-destruct sequence. It links powerful weapons known as Holy Guns to Nell and Seana's corpses, re-animating them as Elementals with only one purpose: seek and destroy the Network.

Nell and Seana battle their way towards Owato, where Bel Cain and his older brother and subordinate Ialu are also headed. Bel Cain visits the Network, revealed to be made of mass amounts of brain-matter of the casualties of war. Bel Cain believes that the people who gave their lives to the Network will find a way to carry out his plans.

Bel Cain has vowed to avenge his mother by killing and overthrowing her murderer, King Jabugal. Ialu reports that the excavation unit at the Goate Mountains have been destroyed, the cause being one or two armored individuals mounted with incredible weapons headed towards Owato. King Jabugal tries to escape after plundering Owato of its riches. However, Bel Cain shoots the king, killing him in front of onlooking nobles. Bel Cain criticizes the people for blindly following a king who exploited his people, then tells them to cast aside the memory of King Jabugal and bow down before him. The nobles cooperate.

Nell and Seana fly into Owato and make their way to the inner depths of the palace. Ialu urges the prince to retreat, but Bel Cain decides to stay, remembering a younger Nell telling him that his strength of character will serve him well. Ialu has the royal guards escort him to safety by force.

Nell and Seana encounter Reftraseal, a creature resembling a dragon. Once Reftraseal is destroyed, an entity resembling Nell's elemental appearance jumps out of Reftraseal. After a battle, the entity is destroyed. The entity is revealed to be piloted by Bel Cain. Mortally wounded, he laments how his carefully set plans and the sacrifices of his subordinates have proven fruitless. Nell approaches. The Prince recognizes her by the amulet she is still wearing. Reunited with his childhood friend, unaware that Nell's corpse is controlled by the Holy Gun, the Prince dies with a peaceful expression.

Nell carries the corpse of Bel Cain with her to the Network. She fires her elemental gun at the Network, destroying it. Having completed the task Nell was reanimated for, a blue light envelops Nell and Bel Cain, who perish together. Bel Cain speaks to the player: "One day, all will put away the destructive desires of self, striving only to create a world without barriers. I failed. You must succeed."

Journal entries written by Tagami reveal that Tagami came from another dimension and gave the Network access to the holy guns, anticipating the malfunction of the Network to mount the holy guns to Nell and Seana's bodies. The life expectancy of their bodies was limited to 24 hours, the exact amount of time needed for the holy gun to destroy Bel Cain's kingdom. Due to an accident with the dimensional gate, Tagami's return to her world is impossible. She enters cryogenic suspension until the gate can be repaired. She makes a private note, reading "Farewell, Yuri. I shall always love you."

Centuries later, Tagami finds Bel Cain's half of the pendant.

Gameplay
As is the norm with light gun shooters, the action in Elemental Gearbolt takes place from a first-person perspective, and the pace of the game and rate of enemy occurrence is completely preset. The player is only required to aim and shoot with the light gun. Most light gun games require the player to reload as ammunition is expended, but Elemental Gearbolt does not, since both the player characters and their weapons are magical. Instead, the game limits the speed at which the player can fire. The player can switch freely between three types of attacks - Blaze Phoenix, a basic, high powered shot; Thunder Tiger, a spread shot; and Water Snake, a rapid shot.

At the conclusion of each stage the player has the opportunity to select percentages of the score for the stage to allocate towards bonus points or experience. As in an RPG, the player characters gain levels by accruing experience, and thus grow more powerful and are better able to take damage. Score determines rank, and in the year following the game's North American release it was used to participate in contests sponsored by Working Designs.

The game supports all of the licensed PlayStation light guns, as well as the Dual Analog Controller.

Music
The official soundtrack features a 24½-minute drama track in Japanese and 19 original score cues performed by a full orchestra. It was released by First Smile Entertainment on January 21, 1998 in Japan. Its catalogue ID is FSCA-10030 and the original price in Japan was 2,548¥. Kei Wakakusa composed and arranged the score.

Promotion
Some winners of Working Designs' contests for Elemental Gearbolt in the 1998 E3 at the Georgia World Congress Center received 'Assassin Case' prizes that contained gold-plated GunCon light guns. These Assassin Cases are among the most rare and prized collectibles from the PlayStation era.

Reception
Metacritic, which assigns a normalised rating in the 0–100 range, calculated an average score of 76 out of 100 ("Favorable"), based on reviews from 11 professional critics.

The title featured in 3rd place in a 2022 Retro Gamer list of the 'Top 25 Light Gun Games', with critic Ashley Day describing it as a "unique fusion of shooter and RPG" with "exceptional game design complemented by a captivating world view (reminiscent of Panzer Dragoon), gorgeous anime cutscenes...and one of the greatest soundtracks on PS1".

See also
Gunparade March
Shikigami no Shiro
Mars Daybreak

References

External links
 Official website
 Elemental Gearbolt at MobyGames
 Elemental Gearbolt at GameFAQs
 Gaming Sanctuary review
 Elemental Gearbolt OST review at Soundtrack Central

1997 video games
Alfa System games
Light gun games
PlayStation (console) games
PlayStation (console)-only games
Science fantasy video games
Working Designs
Multiplayer and single-player video games
Video games developed in Japan